Al-Dana may refer to:
 Al-Dana, Syria
 Al-Dana, Maarrat al-Nu'man
 Al-Dana (vessel)
 Al-Dana Island, UAE